Amusium is a genus of scallops, marine bivalve molluscs belonging to the family Pectinidae.

Extant species
 Amusium pleuronectes Linnaeus, 1758

Extinct species
Extinct species within this genus include:
 †Amusium aguaclarensis Hodson, 1927
 Amusium balloti Bernardi, 1861
 †Amusium bocasense Olsson, 1922
 †Amusium cristatum (Bronn, 1827)
 †Amusium darwinianum d'Orbigny, 1846
 †Amusium filosum Hauer, 1857
 †Amusium hulshofi Martin, 1883
 †Amusium lucens Tate, 1886
 †Amusium mimyum Woodring, 1982
 †Amusium mortoni Ravenel, 1844
 †Amusium orientale Dey, 1961
 †Amusium papyraceum Gabb, 1873
 †Amusium paris del Rio, 1992
 †Amusium sol Brown and Pilsbry, 1913
 †Amusium toulae Brown and Pilsbry, 1911
 †Amussium alazanum Cooke, 1928
 †Amussium destefanii Ugolini, 1903
 †Amussium lompocensis Arnold, 1907
 †Amussium subcorneum d'Archaic and Haime, 1854

This genus is known in the fossil record from the Carboniferous period to the Quaternary period (age range: 336.0 to 0.012 million years ago). These fossils have been found all over the world.

References

Pectinidae
Extant Carboniferous first appearances
Bivalve genera